Saint Severin or Saint-Séverin may refer to:

Churches
 Basilica of St. Severin, Cologne
 Saint-Séverin, Paris, in the Latin Quarter of Paris
 St. Severin's Old Log Church, on the National Register of Historic Places in Pennsylvania
 St. Severin, Keitum church on Sylt, Germany
 St. Severin, a church in Eilendorf, Germany

People
 Severinus, Exuperius, and Felician (died 170), saints
 Severinus of Bordeaux (died 420), saint
 Severinus of Cologne (c. 320 – 404), saint
 Severinus of Noricum (410s–482), saint
 Severinus Boethius (c. 477 – 524), Roman consul and philosopher (and saint)
 Severinus of Sanseverino (died 550), saint
 Galéas de Saint-Séverin (c. 1460 – 1525), Italian-French condottiere and grand écuyer de France

Places
 Saint-Séverin, a commune in the Charente department in southwestern France
 Saint-Séverin-sur-Boutonne, a commune in the Charente-Maritime department in southwestern France
 Saint-Séverin-d'Estissac, a commune in the Dordogne department in Aquitaine in southwestern France
 Saint-Séverin, Chaudière-Appalaches, Quebec, a parish in the Municipalité régionale de comté Robert-Cliche in Canada
 Saint-Séverin, Mauricie, Quebec, a parish municipality

Other uses
 Rue Saint-Séverin, Paris

See also 
 St. Severin's Abbey, Kaufbeuren, Germany
 Severin (disambiguation)
 Severin (given name)